Éamonn Dillon (born 1992) is an Irish hurler who plays for Dublin Senior Championship club Naomh Fionnbarra and at intercounty level with the Dublin senior hurling team. He usually lines out as a forward.

Career

A member of the Naomh Fionnbarra club in Cabra, Dillon first came to prominence on the inter-county scene as goalkeeper on the Dublin minor team in 2010. He later switched to the forwards with the Dublin under-21 team, winning a Leinster Under-21 Championship title in 2011. He joined the Dublin senior hurling team in 2012 and won a Leinster Championship title the following year.

He was injured for Dublin's 2021 All-Ireland SHC campaign.

Honours

Dublin
Leinster Senior Hurling Championship: 2013
Leinster Under-21 Hurling Championship: 2011

References

External links
Éamonn Dillon profile at the Dublin GAA website

1992 births
Living people
Dublin inter-county hurlers
Irish electricians